Julia Görges was the defending champion, but chose not to participate.

Pauline Parmentier won the singles final defeating Patricia Mayr-Achleitner 1–6, 6–4, 6–4.

Seeds

Draw

Finals

Top half

Bottom half

References
 Main Draw
 Qualifying Draw

Open GDF Suez de Biarritz - Singles